Coronoplectrum is a single-species genus of unknown familial placement in the order Lecanorales. The only species in the monotypic genus is  Coronoplectrum namibicum, a fruticose (bushy), saxicolous (rock-dwelling) lichen found in Namibia. The genus was circumscribed by Franklin Brusse in 1987.

References

Lecanorales
Lichen genera
Monotypic Lecanorales genera
Taxa described in 1987